The 2022 The Women's Tour was the eighth staging of The Women's Tour, a women's cycling stage race held in Great Britain. It ran from 6 to 11 June 2022, as part of the 2022 UCI Women's World Tour.

The race was won by Elisa Longo Borghini of Trek–Segafredo, by a margin of just 1 second.

Route 
The route was announced in spring 2022, with stage 5 having a mountain top finish on Black Mountain in the Brecon Beacons in Wales. The finish was noted to be the hardest mountain top finish of a Women's Tour, with an average gradient of 5.3%.

Summary 
97 riders from 17 teams were entered in the race, with 13 of the teams being from the UCI Women's World Tour. For the first time, all stages were broadcast live.

Elisa Longo Borghini came third in the final bunch sprint in Oxford, gaining 4 bonus seconds and taking the overall classification by just 1 second from Grace Brown. To honour journalist Richard Moore, a special award for the rider who "went above and beyond with the media" was presented to Clara Copponi.

Classification leadership table

Result

See also 

 2022 in women's road cycling

References

External links 
 

2022
2022 UCI Women's World Tour
2022 in women's road cycling
2022 in British women's sport
June 2022 sports events in the United Kingdom